A Tribal Council is the governing body for certain tribes within the United States or elsewhere (since ancient times), generally along regional, ethnic or linguistic lines. Several sovereign American Indian Nations in the United States are organized as Tribal Councils. The Navajo Nation, or Dineh, were formally governed by the Navajo Tribal Council, known today as the Navajo Nation Council. The Crow Nation in Montana was once organized as the Crow Tribal Council. Since the late 20th century, the Crow Nation changed their constitution and organized as a three-branch government with a ceremonial Crow Tribal General. 

The term usually describes the governing body of a tribe that is typically distinct from other tribes as a matter of geography, native language, religion and culture. The tribe, usually comprising a single Reservation (although some tribes have more than one, and many have none) is the basic unit of government. Federally recognized tribes in the United States are considered "domestic dependent nations", and they have sovereign status somewhat comparable to the individual American States. Different tribes may choose governance structures for themselves, but most tribes have adopted democratic governments in which a Tribal Council or the equivalent functions as a legislative body and an elected or appointed Chairman has an executive role comparable to a President or Prime Minister. On a few American Indian reservations such as the Hopi Reservation and the Haudenosaunee (Iroquois) reservations, a U.S.-recognized and -funded, democratically-elected tribal government operates in parallel, and in some cases, in conflict with, the nation's traditionalist governance.

Tribal Councils in the United States

Great Lakes Inter-Tribal Council
Inter Tribal Council of Arizona, Inc.
Inter-tribal Council of Michigan
Minnesota Indian Affairs Council
Navajo Nation Council
Siletz Tribal Council
Williamsburg Tribal Council

Native American organizations